The Commander-in-Chief, Levant was a senior administrative shore commander of the Royal Navy whose post was established in February 1943. The British Chiefs of Staff Committee ordered at that time that the Mediterranean Fleet was to be divided into two commands; one responsible for naval operations involving ships, and the other administrative and support, responsible for shore establishments. His subordinate establishments, and staff were sometimes informally known as the Levant Command or Levant Station, In December 1943 the title was changed to Flag Officer, Levant and East Mediterranean. In January 1944 the two separate commands were re-unified into a single command with FOLEM merging back into Commander-in-Chief Mediterranean Fleet.

History
Shore-based naval area commands in the Mediterranean and Middle East theatre had historically reported to the Commander-in-Chief Mediterranean Fleet. 

"A Flag Officer (Liaison), Rear-Admiral F. Elliott, had been appointed to co-ordinate matters of local defence [of Alexandria], and he was already the Fortress Commander in all but name. In war he was to be responsible to the General Officer Commanding British Troops in Egypt for the security of the Fortress, but was to meet the requirements of the Commander-in-Chief, Mediterranean, in every possible way." 

In 1940, responsibility for the Red Sea area was transferred from the Commander-in-Chief, East Indies to the Mediterranean Fleet and did not revert until 1942. Following a meeting in London, the Chiefs of Staff Committee signaled on 2 February 1943 to Admiral Sir Andrew Cunningham, Commander-in-Chief, Mediterranean, that:

1). The Mediterranean will be divided into two commands:(a) the area to the west line A to B to be the Mediterranean command. (b) the area to the East of the above line to be the Levant command which will include the Red Sea. 2). For the present the line A to B will be the line running from the Tunisian/Tripolitanian border to a position in Latitude 35 degrees North, Longitude 60 degrees East, thence to Cape Spartivento (Italy).
 
Between 1943 and 1945 the shore commands reporting to C-in-C Levant were Tunisia (1943); North Africa, (1943-1944), Sicily (July–September 1943); Taranto September 1943- May 1945; FO West Italy September 1943-October 1944; Northern Mediterranean October 1944, and Western Mediterranean (January 1943- January 1944 & July 1944 -1945). The dockyards at Gibraltar and Malta continued as major bases supporting the new organisation. In December 1943 the command was renamed  Levant and Eastern Mediterranean. 

In August 1946 the command was retitled the Flag Officer, Middle East, part of the tri-service British Middle East Command, until 1959.

Commanders in Chief

Sub-commands, 1943 to 1946

Naval Officer-in-Charge, Aden

Commodore-in-Charge, Algiers

Flag Officer, North Africa

Flag Officer, Northern Area, Mediterranean

Flag Officer, Sicily

Flag Officer, Taranto Area

Flag Officer, Tunisia

Flag Officer, Western Italy

Flag Officer, Western Mediterranean

Rear-Admiral, Alexandria

The Commander, Levant Area, was responsible to the Rear-Admiral, Alexandria.

References

Sources
  Cook, Chris (2006). The Routledge Guide to British Political Archives: Sources Since 1945. Cambridge, England: Routledge. ISBN 
 Grehan, John; Mace, Martin (2014). "Introduction". The War at Sea in the Mediterranean 1940–1944. Barnsley, England: Pen and Sword. .
 Mackie, Colin. (2018) "Royal Navy Senior Appointments from 1865" (PDF). gulabin.com. C. Mackie.
 Peterson, J. E. (2016). Defending Arabia. Cambridge, England: Routledge. .
 Roberts, John (2009). Safeguarding the Nation: The Story of the Modern Royal Navy. Barnsley, England: Seaforth Publishing. 
 Roskill, S.W. (2004). The war at sea : 1939-1945 : history of the second world war. Uckfield, Eng.: Naval and Military Press. .
  "The Western Powers and the ME". Middle East Record. The Moshe Dayan Center. 2: 90. 1961. 
  (Viscount), Andrew Browne Cunningham Cunningham of Hyndhope (2006). The Cunningham Papers: Selections from the Private and Official Correspondence of Admiral of the Fleet Viscount Cunningham of Hyndhope. Farnham, England: Ashgate Publishing, Ltd. .
 Watson, Dr Graham. "Royal Navy Organization in World War 2, 1939-1945". naval-history.net. G. Smith, 19 September 2015.

L
1943 establishments in the British Empire
Military units and formations established in 1943
Military units and formations of the Royal Navy in World War II